Muckleford may refer to:

Muckleford, Dorset, a hamlet in England
Muckleford, Victoria, a locality in Australia